Enver Ferizaj (born 15 June 1950) is an Albanian businessman who serves as the President of the Albanian Agribusiness Council (KASH), the biggest organization reaching all sectors of Agriculture in Albania. KASH has 23 nationwide member associations with elected bodies in 12 prefectures and 36 districts of Albania.

Ferizaj studied at the Agriculture University of Tirana and in 1976 graduated as an agrarian economist. 
He started his work experience in the municipalities of Luz i Vogël and Lekaj where he worked as a chairman of the branch of plan until 1990. Later he was appointed Director in the Nutrition Enterprise in Kavajë and worked there until 1995. Besides his work, Enver manages also his private activity, as president of his own company "EN&ZY", which owns the former meat factory in Kavajë and a flour factory in Gosë.
In 1996 Enver Ferizaj was appointed Chairman of the Chamber of Commerce and Industry of the district of Kavajë and held this post until 2003. Meanwhile, from 1998 to 2005 he was Vice President of the National Association HABA. He later served as a Member of the Municipal Council of Kavajë between the years 2000–2007.

References

Businesspeople from Kavajë
Albanian businesspeople
1950 births
Living people